DEV Aratere is a roll-on/roll-off rail and vehicle ferry operated by KiwiRail in New Zealand. Built in 1998 for the then private company Tranz Rail and lengthened in 2011, she operates four daily crossings on the Interislander service across Cook Strait from Wellington to Picton each day (with six crossings over the December/January period).

History
Diesel Electric Vessel (DEV) Aratere was built for Tranz Rail in 1998 to replace the Aratika. The name "Aratere" is a Māori-language word meaning "quick path" (ara = "path, route", tere = "fast, quick").

In 2011, Aratere underwent a $52 million refit at the Sembawang shipyard in Singapore, increasing her capacity from 360 to 600 passengers. The refit included a new bow and stern. The ship was lengthened by cutting it in half to insert a new  midsection.

Incidents

Aratere has been involved in several technical problems and engine failures over her years in service. There is no official relationship between these incidents, though the media have stoked speculation that the ferry may be jinxed and she has earned the nickname "El Lemon". Notable incidents have included: 
 25 February 1999 - An engine failure.
 18 December 2000 - An engine malfunction.
 1 October 2004 - "30 seconds of potential disaster" after Aratere had a steering fault in the Marlborough Sounds.
 10 February 2005 - Aratere was detained after a "crisis of confidence" with inspectors noting that she had arrived from Spain six years earlier in a shocking state. They could no longer allow her to operate as she was  She was eventually allowed to sail again on 15 March.
 After the extensive refit carried out in Singapore in 2011, she has once again experienced numerous incidents, including engine failures. On 2 November 2011 Maritime NZ ordered the ship to stop operating until proven safe.
 On 5 November 2013, Aratere snapped a drive shaft, losing a propeller in Cook Strait.  This initially forced the ship out of service, causing disruption to Interislander schedules.  Subsequently, the ship was allowed to make freight only crossings with only one propeller for propulsion.

Layout

Aratere has both rail and vehicle decks. These can be loaded simultaneously through the stern via a double linkspan. A lower hold has additional space for cars, though access to this hold was blocked off after the refit in Singapore.

Aratere has six decks.

 Deck 1 - Engine and propulsion rooms
 Deck 2 - Rail deck
 Deck 3 - Road vehicle deck
 Deck 4 - Bar, Foodcourt, Shop, Lounge, Deck Access
 Deck 5 - Premium Lounge, Drivers Accommodation, Deck Access including outdoor seating.
 Deck 6 - Bridge and sun deck

Service
Aratere operates six crossings of the Cook Strait each day (three passenger, three freight). In late 2009, Aratere celebrated her 20,000th crossing, having travelled around 2 million kilometres.

References

External links 
 Aratere at Interislander website
 New Zealand Herald Aratere-related articles
 Dominion Post (Wellington, New Zealand) Aratere-related articles 
 New Zealand Maritime Index: MV Aratere

Cook Strait ferries
1998 ships
Ships built in Spain